Events from the year 1904 in Russia.

Incumbents
 Monarch – Nicholas II

Events

 
 
 
 
 
 Battle of Chemulpo Bay
 Battle of Liaoyang
 Battle of Port Arthur
 1904 Moscow tornado
 Russo-Japanese War
 Siege of Port Arthur

Births

 
12 August, Alexei Romanov (dies 17 July 1918)

Deaths

 
 
 
  - Anton Chekhov, Russian playwright and short story writer. (b. 1860)
  - Emanuel Schiffers, Russian chess player (d. 1904)
 Maria A. Neidgardt, courtier  (b. 1831)

References

 
Years of the 20th century in the Russian Empire